Lješevići is a village in the municipality of Kotor, Montenegro.

Demographics
According to the 2011 census, its population was 192.

References

Populated places in Kotor Municipality